Bibiyapur is a habitation in the village of Mahry in Mahry Panchayat, Hardoi district, Uttar Pradesh, India. As of 1 April 2009 its population was 451.

References

Villages in Hardoi district